is a former Japanese actress, singer, model, and television personality. She is a former member of the idol girl group Keyakizaka46 (now Sakurazaka46).

Career

Early career 

She left the group in March 2012.

2015–2018: Keyakizaka46 
On August 21, 2015, Imaizumi along with 22 other members were announced for the newly created idol group, Toriizaka46 (later Keyakizaka46). Imaizumi made her musical debut with Keyakizaka46's first single, "Silent Majority". She formed a duo named  with Yui Kobayashi due to the fact that they share the same name and play the guitar. After debuting in Silent Majority, the duo continued performing after positive fan feedback. Additionally, Imaizumi made two song appearances as part of Sakamichi AKB (坂道AKB), a group made of various AKB48 and Sakamichi members. Aside from music, Imaizumi also started her modeling career, becoming a regular model for the fashion magazine Ar and published a solo photobook titled .

In April 2017, Imaizumi took an temporary leave from the group due to poor health and returned in August the same year. She took another break in December.

After the release of "Ambivalent", Imaizumi officially departed from the group on November 5, 2018 during a farewell ceremony in Kyoto, expressing her desire to pursue other forms of entertainment. She became the third member to leave the group, and the first member to leave since their musical debut.

2019–2022: Solo career 
In January, Imaizumi changed her management company from Sony Music Japan to Avex Group. Her first independent acting role was in the stage play . Since then, Imaizumi has been involved in many different projects. She was featured in a variety show produced by TV Asahi titled , was a regular on the MBS Radio show , starred in the 2020 movie , and performed in a stage adaptation of Azumi.

On July 4, 2021, Imaizumi ended her contract with Avex and became an independent talent. She launched her official blog on September 30.

In November 2021, Imaizumi portrayed the title character in the stage adaptation of the manga Lady Snowblood and performed the theme song, which was released digitally. She continued the role in the sequel in February 2022.

In September 2022, it was announced that Imaizumi had been suffering with hearing loss. She still appeared in the stage play Saigo no Isha wa Sakura wo Miagete Kimi wo Omou that month as scheduled, although in a different role.

On October 26, Imaizumi announced her retirement from the entertainment industry, citing concerns about the media's intrusion to the private lives of her family and child. She also revealed that she has been diagnosed with mild squamous intraepithelial lesions.

Personal life 
Imaizumi has four older brothers and is the youngest child in her family.

In January 2021, Imaizumi announced her pregnancy and upcoming marriage to then-YouTuber and rapper Mahoto Watanabe. She gave birth to a girl on June 25, 2021. However, due to Watanabe's arrest, Imaizumi announced that she would not be registering her marriage to him and would raise her child with the help of her family.

Discography

Keyakizaka46

Sakamichi AKB

Solo career

Filmography

Film

Television

Theater

References

External links 
 Official Site 

1998 births
Living people
Japanese idols
Keyakizaka46 members
Musicians from Kanagawa Prefecture